Electric current collectors are used by trolleybuses, trams, electric locomotives or EMUs to carry electrical power from overhead lines, electrical third rails, or ground-level power supplies to the electrical equipment of the vehicles. Those for overhead wires are roof-mounted devices, those for rails are mounted on the bogies.

Typically, electric current connectors have one or more spring-loaded arms that press a collector or contact shoe against the rail or overhead wire.  As the vehicle moves, the contact shoe slides along the wire or rail to draw the electricity needed to run the vehicle's motor.

The current collector arms are electrically conductive but mounted insulated on the vehicle's roof, side or base.  An insulated cable connects the collector with the switch, transformer or motor. The steel rails of the tracks act as the electrical return.

Pantographs and poles 

Electric vehicles that collect their current from an overhead line system use different forms of one- or two-arm pantograph collectors, bow collectors or trolley poles. The current collection device presses against the underside of the lowest wire of an overhead line system, which is called a contact wire.

Most overhead supply systems are either DC or single phase AC, using a single wire with return through the grounded running rails. Three phase AC systems use a pair of overhead wires, and paired trolley poles.

The trolley pole wheel is a grooved contact wheel mounted on top of the trolley pole instead of a trolley shoe. The trolley pole wheel somewhat resembles a pulley. Trolley pole wheels are now rarely used.

A collector pole is the pole at the end of a bumper car. It has a contact shoe on top.

Electric overhead cranes and gantry cranes may use a current collector system to provide power over the full length of their operating area. The current collector assembly use sliding shoes that run on rails.  Depending on the size of crane, contact rails may be copper wires, copper bars, or steel channels. mounted on insulating supports. Two rails are used for DC supply, and three for three-phase AC, with grounding of the crane through contact with the runway rails. The contact rails are mounted out of the reach of people working in the area to prevent an electric shock hazard.

Contact shoe 
Electric railways with third rails, or fourth rails, carry collector or contact shoes projecting laterally (sideways), or vertically, from their bogies. The contact shoe may slide on top of the third rail (top running), on the bottom (bottom running) or on the side (side running). The side running contact shoe is used against the guide bars on rubber-tired metros. A vertical contact shoe is used on fourth rail systems. A pair of contact shoes was used on underground current collection systems. Contact shoes may also be used on overhead conductor rails, on guide bars or on trolley wires in the case of trams or trolleybuses. Most railways use three rails, while the London Underground uses four rails. Trams or trolleybuses use a grooved trolley shoe at the end of a trolley pole. A contact shoe is used as a ground on the running rail of a rubber-tired metro.

Contact ski 
A long and narrow contact shoe shaped like a ski, or "skid" or "ski collector" or "contact ski", was historically used on stud contact systems so it maintains contact with small studs in the road placed at large intervals. A single ski was as long as 12 feet in some systems. Stud contact systems were short-lived due to safety issues with the studs. They were supposed to be electrified only when compatible vehicles passed over them, but the studs often malfunctioned and remained electrified continuously, posing an electrocution hazard.

See also 

 Bumper cars
 Conduit current collection
 Electromote
 Guide bar
 List of railway electrification systems
 Overhead line
 Pantographs and underbody collectors
 Railway electrification systems

References

External links 

Electric rail transport